Devil's Bath is a large cenote located on Vancouver Island in British Columbia, Canada.

Geology
This connection maintains the presence of water within the sinkhole.

Access

See also
Marble River Provincial Park
List of caves in Canada

References

Caves of British Columbia
Regional District of Mount Waddington